Hanky Panky is the debut album of Tommy James and the Shondells and was released in 1966.  It reached #46 on the Billboard 200.  The album had two singles that charted.  "Hanky Panky" reached #1 on the Billboard Hot 100 and "Say I Am (What I Am)" reached #21.

Other than a brief impromptu performance together onstage in Pittsburgh several days earlier, after which James invited the band to serve as his new Shondells, the first time the entire band worked together was when they went into the studio to record this album.

Track listing

Credits 

 Tommy James – lead vocals
 Joseph Kessler – guitar; backing vocals
 George Magura – bass guitar, piano, tenor saxophone, vibraphone
 Vincent Pietropaoli – clarinet, drums, saxophone
 Ron Rosman – organ, piano; lead vocals on "The Lover"
 Mike Vale – bass guitar; backing vocals, lead vocals on "I'm So Proud" and "Love Makes The World Go Round"

Bob Mack is the producer.

Charts
Album

Singles

References

1966 debut albums
Tommy James and the Shondells albums
Roulette Records albums